Karonge is a village in the Commune of Bubanza in Bubanza Province in north western Burundi.

References

External links
Satellite map at Maplandia.com

Populated places in Burundi
Bubanza Province